Fred Elliott is a fictional character from the British ITV soap opera Coronation Street played by John Savident. He made his first appearance during the episode airing on 26 August 1994. Savident quit the role in 2005 and Fred died on-screen on 11 October 2006.

Storylines
A year after the death of Fred's first wife, Sybil, Fred became romantically involved with Kathleen Gutteridge (Elizabeth Rider), an employee in the old shop and she got pregnant but rejected Fred's proposal of marriage, feeling too young to be tied down. Kathleen agreed to allow Fred's sister, Beryl Peacock (Anny Tobin) and her husband, Sam, to adopt her baby boy and they raised Ashley, never telling him of his true parentage. In 1999, Fred let slip to Audrey Roberts (Sue Nicholls) that Ashley is actually his son and Beryl confirmed it.

In 1997, Fred married Maureen Holdsworth (Sherrie Hewson) but Maureen quickly tired of Fred's overbearing nature and plans for their future and left him a week after the wedding. Fred then married barmaid Eve Sykes (Melanie Kilburn) in 2001. He also bought the Rovers Return pub for her to work in. However, it transpired that Eve had never divorced her first husband, Ray, leaving Fred alone again. In 2004 Fred fell out with his friend Mike Baldwin (Johnny Briggs) when he had an affair with his girlfriend Penny King. Fred was further embittered towards Mike when he introduced him to Stacy Hilton who conned him by playing on his feelings. During a game of poker Mike used Fred's feelings against him and exploited the no limit rule to win his butcher's shop. When Mike let Fred keep the business the men were finally reconciled. In 2006, after a brief courtship, Bev Unwin (Susie Blake) accepted a proposal from Fred and planned to marry in October. Intending to retire to the country, Fred sold the Rovers to Steve McDonald (Simon Gregson). While waiting to marry Bev on his wedding day, Fred left the church to talk to Audrey since she had recently admitted her feelings for him, despite declining his proposal. After a discussion in which he asserted his love and commitment to marrying Bev, he left to return to the church but collapsed, and died of a massive stroke in the lobby of Audrey's house.

Development
Fred's character was developed to loudly repeat everything he said, similar to the way Looney Tunes character Foghorn Leghorn speaks.

Actor John Savident has revealed that, when filming scenes as Fred, he "was inspired by quirks of real-life people." He explained in an interview with Digital Spy that "a neighbour from his childhood was among the people who influenced his performances." He also claimed that he based Fred's mannerisms "on people I knew."

John Savident has claimed that he left the soap because he was "simply tired of the five episodes per week grind; probably made worse by the fact that as a Corrie linchpin he was in virtually every episode, with the double toil of repeating all his lines twice."

Reception
Fred has been opined as the second best Coronation Street character by The Guardian, and has been described by them as "the big, bald ballsack who said everything twice, and boomingly, started out as a comic gargoyle and became ever sweeter: I said, became ever sweeter...John Savident's performance made his failed love affairs moving and his death on his wedding day a calamity." He has also been described as "a colourful character of the type that used to abound Coronation Street but is now becoming scarce."

Based on the characters amount of declined proposals, Fred has been described as someone "who's heard the word 'No!' more times than the celebrity booker on Patrick Kielty Live."

Grace Dent of The Guardian claimed, upon the character's exit from the soap, that she would "miss Fred Elliott a lot", and that she'd "miss his blunt common sense, forever flawed by his quirk of proposing to every woman he set eyes on...his rants about the life-enhancing properties of steak and kidney pudding...his barely concealed enjoyment of a good gossip with Shelley, Betty, and Violet in the Rovers backroom...how sometimes Fred would be propping up the bar, saying an unremarkable line in a throwaway scene, but add a wobble of the head or a camp tap of the fag that somehow made it profound."

His final episode, which aired on 9 October 2006, was viewed by 11 million, which exceeded EastEnders' 9 million that evening.

References

External links

Coronation Street characters
Television characters introduced in 1994
Fictional bartenders
Fictional butchers
Fictional shopkeepers
Male villains
Male characters in television